Milwaukie Pioneer Cemetery is an historic cemetery in Milwaukie, Oregon, United States.

References

External links
 
 
 
 

Cemeteries in Oregon
Milwaukie, Oregon